Brayden Maynard (born 20 September 1996) is an Australian rules footballer who currently plays for the Collingwood Football Club in the Australian Football League (AFL).

State football
Maynard played junior football with the Hampton Rovers in the Victorian Amateur Football Association (VAFA). Maynard represented Sandringham Dragons in the TAC Cup. He played 13 games for them in the 2013 TAC Cup season and 17 games in the 2014 TAC Cup season. During the 2014 season, he averaged 22 disposals and 6 tackles per game, winning the club's season best and fairest award. Sandringham Dragons' talent manager, Ryan O'Connor, compared Maynard to Luke Hodge, saying "he's a really exciting player because he’s quite explosive and powerful and has got a beautiful left foot kick and a real feel for the game." Maynard represented Vic Metro at the 2014 AFL Under 18 Championships, averaging 15 disposals and 5 tackles per game. He was named among the best players in both matches against Vic Country, and scored a goal in the second game against Vic Country as well as in both games against Western Australia.

AFL career
Maynard was drafted by Collingwood with their third selection and 30th pick overall in the 2014 AFL draft. After being drafted to the club, he was glad that he knew his fellow draftees, having played with Jordan De Goey, Darcy Moore, and Matthew Goodyear at the AFL Under 18 Championships. He made his debut against Hawthorn in round 14 of the 2015 season. After the 2017 season, Maynard signed a contract extension until the end of the 2020 season. Maynard played in Collingwood's losing team in the 2018 Grand Final against West Coast. He was involved in the controversial goal at the end, with some fans and analysts claiming he should've been awarded a free kick after being blocked by Willie Rioli, which allowed Dom Sheed to mark and kick the winning goal. In April 2019, despite having more than a year left on his contract, Collingwood signed Maynard on another two year contract extension, keeping him at the club until the end of the 2022 season. In the 2019 season, Maynard came in fifth in the Copeland Trophy count, giving a humorous speech, which included a light dig at Justin Longmuir, Collingwood's assistant coach who left to take up the head coaching role at Fremantle. In the third round of the 2020 season, Maynard played his 100th game for Collingwood.

Coaching
In 2019, Maynard took on an assistant coaching role, under Peter Schwab, at De La Salle College where he studied.

Personal life
Maynard was born in Adelaide, but grew up in Melbourne barracking for Melbourne. He is the son of Peter Maynard, who played for Melbourne in the AFL and for Glenelg in the South Australian National Football League (SANFL) and the grandson of Graham Campbell, who played and coached Fitzroy, as well as coaching West Perth and Glenelg. His brother, Corey, played football for Melbourne in the AFL as a category B rookie after a career playing basketball professionally. He attended De La Salle College in Malvern, an inner suburb of Melbourne.

Statistics
Updated to the end of the 2022 season.

|-
| 2015 ||  || 37
| 9 || 2 || 0 || 76 || 48 || 124 || 25 || 30 || 0.2 || 0.0 || 8.4 || 5.3 || 13.8 || 2.8 || 3.3 || 0
|- 
| 2016 ||  || 37
| 20 || 4 || 7 || 215 || 95 || 310 || 89 || 71 || 0.2 || 0.4 || 10.8 || 4.8 || 15.5 || 4.5 || 3.6 || 0
|-
| 2017 ||  || 37
| 22 || 6 || 4 || 256 || 126 || 382 || 91 || 72 || 0.3 || 0.2 || 11.6 || 5.7 || 17.4 || 4.1 || 3.3 || 0
|- 
| 2018 ||  || 37
| 22 || 2 || 4 || 247 || 152 || 399 || 69 || 89 || 0.1 || 0.2 || 11.2 || 6.9 || 18.1 || 3.1 || 4.0 || 0
|-
| 2019 ||  || 37
| 24 || 1 || 3 || 310 || 144 || 454 || 104 || 92 || 0.04 || 0.1 || 12.9 || 6.0 || 18.9 || 4.3 || 3.8 || 1
|- 
| 2020 ||  || 37
| 19 || 0 || 1 || 256 || 95 || 351 || 80 || 47 || 0.0 || 0.1 || 13.5 || 5.0 || 18.5 || 4.2 || 2.5 || 0
|-
| 2021 ||  || 37
| 22 || 1 || 0 || 335 || 126 || 461 || 121 || 57 || 0.05 || 0.0 || 15.2 || 5.7 || 21.0 || 5.5 || 2.6 || 0
|-
| 2022 ||  || 37
| 20 || 1 || 1 || 240 || 111 || 351 || 93 || 67 || 0.1 || 0.1 || 12.0 || 5.6 || 17.6 || 4.7 || 3.4 || 0
|- class=sortbottom
! colspan=3 | Career
! 161 !! 17 !! 21 !! 1964 !! 907 !! 2871 !! 687 !! 539 !! 0.1 !! 0.1 !! 12.2 !! 5.6 !! 17.8 !! 4.3 !! 3.3 !! 1
|}

Notes

Honours and achievements
Individual
 All-Australian team: 2022

References

External links

Living people
1996 births
Collingwood Football Club players
Sandringham Dragons players
Australian rules footballers from Victoria (Australia)